Sir John William Atwell CBE PRSE FREng FIMechE (24 November 1911 – 5 July 1999) was a  Scottish engineer

Life

Born in Glasgow in 1911 the son of William Atwell (d. 1953) and his wife, Sarah Workman, John Atwell attended Hyndland Secondary School in Glasgow. He then served an apprenticeship with Yarrow Shipbuilders in Scotstoun, Glasgow.

In 1939 he received an MSc from King's College, Cambridge (where he was a Caird Travelling Scholar). He then began working as a manager at Stewarts & Lloyds, who were one of Britain's largest shell manufacturers during the Second World War.

In 1963, he was elected a Fellow of the Royal Society of Edinburgh. His proposers were Sir Samuel Curran, John Currie Gunn, Sir David Stirling Anderson and Frederick Malloch Bruce. From 1977 to 1982 he served as their Treasurer and from 1982 to 1985 was the President. In 1992 he was awarded the RSE Bicentenary Medal.

From 1968 to 1970, he was Chairman of the Weir Group. In 1973 he received an honorary doctorate (LLD) from Strathclyde University.

He was awarded a CBE in 1970 and knighted by Queen Elizabeth II in 1976. He died in Glasgow. His remains were cremated.

Family
In 1945, he married Dorothy Baxter, sister of his friend, Allan Baxter.

References

Sources

1911 births
1999 deaths
Commanders of the Order of the British Empire
Presidents of the Royal Society of Edinburgh
Knights Bachelor
Scottish knights